The Luck of the Irish may refer to:
The Luck of the Irish (1920 film)
The Luck of the Irish (1936 film)
The Luck of the Irish (1948 film)
The Luck of the Irish (2001 film)
"The Luck of the Irish" (song), a song by John Lennon and Yoko Ono from Some Time in New York City
"The Luck of the Irish", an episode of Extreme Ghostbusters

See also
Irish Luck (disambiguation)